Home Again is the third studio album by Japanese pop band The Tambourines. It was released on November 26, 2003, seven months after the release of Dizzy Season through Giza Studio.

Background
The album consists of only one previous released singles, such as "Everything is nothing".

This single was released in the Giza Studio's compilation album Giza Studio Masterpiece Blend 2003.

Like "My Back Pages", this album has only eight tracks.

This time six songs out of eight were composed by band themselves.

Charting performance
The album charted at #175 on the Oricon charts in its first week. It charted for 1 week. This is last album which entered into Top 200 Oricon rankings.

Track listing

In media
Everything is nothing - ending theme for Yomiuri TV program Pro no Doumyaku.

References

2003 albums
Being Inc. albums
Japanese-language albums
Giza Studio albums